Valérie Rabault (French: [valeʁi ʁabo]; born 25 April 1973) is a French politician who has presided over the Socialists and affiliated group in the National Assembly since 2018. A member of the Socialist Party (PS), she has represented the 1st constituency of the Tarn-et-Garonne department in Parliament since 2012. Rabault is an engineer by trade.

Early life and career
Rabault attended the École des ponts ParisTech from 1994 to 1998. 

Rabault entered the private sector as a construction manager and then became involved in project financing. She then practiced her professional activity in the banking sector by becoming an inspector at Société Générale, then in 2003, was recruited by BNP Paribas London in the risk monitoring teams. In 2005, she joined the Paris office; from 2010, she became head of risk planning in the equity and commodities division of BNP Paribas Investment Bank. She resigned in June 2012 following her election to the National Assembly.

Political career

Career in local politics
Rabault became a member of the Socialist Party in 2000. From 2002 to 2005, she was a member of the London PS section. Back in France, she joined the federal council of PS section of Tarn-et-Garonne in 2006. In 2012, at the Toulouse congress, she was elected 1st federal secretary of the Socialist Party of Tarn-et-Garonne.

In the 2014 municipal election, Rabault was elected to be a member of Montauban's municipal council. Following the 2020 municipal election, she became a municipal councillor of Piquecos. In the 2021 departmental election, she was also elected to the Departmental Council of Tarn-et-Garonne for the canton of Aveyron-Lère.

Member of the National Assembly, 2012–present
After the vote of the militant base, Rabault was appointed by the Socialist Party as its candidate in the 2012 legislative election in the 1st constituency of Tarn-et-Garonne. She was elected to office on 17 June 2012 against Union for a Popular Movement candidate Brigitte Barèges. She is a member and elected in 2012 vice president of the Committee on Finance, General Economy and Budget of the National Assembly. In April 2014, she refused to enter the government of Prime Minister Manuel Valls as Secretary of State for Trade. Instead, she succeeded Christian Eckert as the Parliament's general rapporteur on the national budget, making her the first woman in that position. 

In 2017, Rabault was in charge of the economy and finance policies of Vincent Peillon's campaign for the Socialist Party presidential primary. She was also a member of his political campaign committee. In the 2017 legislative election, Rabault was reelected as a deputy of Tarn-et-Garonne with over 55% of the second round vote against En Marche! candidate Pierre Mardegan. He had placed first in the first round. She supported Olivier Faure's candidacy for the position of first secretary of the Socialist Party's 2018 convention. 

On 8 July 2017, Rabault joined the Socialist Party's national leadership team. On 11 April 2018, Rabault became chairwoman of the Socialist group in the National Assembly, becoming the first woman to hold the position permanently, as Seybah Dagoma held the office in an acting capacity in 2016 after the appointment of Bruno Le Roux as Minister of the Interior.

On 3 May 2022, it was reported that Rabault had turned down President Emmanuel Macron's offer to make her Prime Minister of France over policy differences.

See also
 2012 French legislative election
 2017 French legislative election
 Tarn-et-Garonne's 1st constituency

References

1973 births
Living people
Lycée Louis-le-Grand alumni
École des Ponts ParisTech alumni
People from L'Haÿ-les-Roses
Politicians from Occitania (administrative region)
Socialist Party (France) politicians
Deputies of the 14th National Assembly of the French Fifth Republic
Deputies of the 15th National Assembly of the French Fifth Republic
21st-century French women politicians
Women members of the National Assembly (France)
French city councillors
Departmental councillors (France)